Hichem Driss (born 1968, in Tunis) is a Tunisian photographer, educated at the École de communication visuelle in Paris. A freelance photographer since 2002, he has often cooperated with other photographers within fashion, design, architecture and art photography. In his series #404, Driss deals with the sudden freedom from censorship in the wake of the Jasmine Revolution in 2011.

Exhibitions

 Degagements—Tunisia One Year On, Paris (2012)
 Nazar: Photographs from the Arab World, Noorderlicht (2004)
 Lettres d'Argiles, Institut Francais de Coopération Tunis (2000)
 Rencontres Africaines de la Photographie, Musée National du Mali, Bamako (1998)
 Les Fiestas du Sud, Marseille (1998) 
 Havana Biennial, Cuba (1997)

References

1968 births
Living people
People from Tunis
Tunisian photographers